Beşkonak is a village in the Kozluk District of Batman Province in Turkey. The village had a population of 192 in 2021.

The hamlets of Ağılbaşı, Erince, Esenlik, Gürsu, Süleymanlar and Şeman are attached to the village.

References 

Villages in Kozluk District
Kurdish settlements in Batman Province